Spiegelberg is a municipality in the Rems-Murr district of Baden-Württemberg, Germany.

History
Spiegelberg's name comes from a glassworking manufactory built in the town in 1699 that produced mirrors from 1705 to 1794.

Geography
The municipality (Gemeinde) of Spiegelberg is located at the northern edge of the Rems-Murr district of Baden-Württemberg, along its border with the district of Heilbronn. Spiegelberg is situated in the valley of the Lauter and within the Swabian-Franconian Forest. Elevation above sea level in the municipal area ranges from a high of  Normalnull (NN) to a low of  NN.

A portion of the Federally protected  nature reserve is located in Spiegelberg's municipal area.

Politics
Spiegelberg has three boroughs (Ortsteile) – Jux, Nassach, and Spiegelberg – and ten villages: Dauernberg, Eisenlautern, Gieshof, Großhöchberg, Hüttlen, Kurzach, Neuhöchberg, Obere Roßstaig, Roßsteig, and Vorderbüchelberg. The industrial district of Roßstaig and the abandoned villages of Glashausen and Lassweiler are also located in the municipal area.

Coat of arms
Spiegelberg's municipal coat of arms is divided party per pale into a left, yellow half and a right, green half. Alternating between these two colors is an oak tree rooted to a three-pointed mountain.

Transportation
Spiegelberg is connected to Germany's network of roadways by its local Landesstraßen and Kreisstraßen. Local public transportation is provided by the Verkehrs- und Tarifverbund Stuttgart.

References

External links

  (in German)

Rems-Murr-Kreis
Württemberg